Nikodem Dyzma is a 1956 Polish political comedy film directed by Jan Rybkowski. It is based on the 1932 political novel Kariera Nikodema Dyzmy by Tadeusz Dołęga-Mostowicz.

Cast
 Adolf Dymsza as Nikodem Dyzma
 Urszula Modrzyńska as Zula
 Kazimierz Fabisiak as Leon Kunicki
 Ewa Krasnodębska as Nina Kunicka
 Lech Madaliński as colonel Wareda
 Andrzej Bogucki as Władysław Jaszuński
 Edward Dziewoński as Jan Ulanicki
 Halina Dobrowolska as Kasia Kunicka
 Tadeusz Fijewski
 Leon Niemczyk
 Emil Karewicz
 Lidia Wysocka as revue singer
 Jarema Stępowski
 Zygmunt Chmielewski 
 Stanisław Milski
 Lidia Korsakówna
 Teresa Lipowska
 Gustaw Lutkiewicz

External links

Polish comedy films
1950s Polish-language films
Films based on Polish novels
Films based on works by Tadeusz Dołęga-Mostowicz
1956 comedy films
1956 films
Polish black-and-white films